Juke may refer to:  

 Juke (football move), a deceptive move in American football
 "Juke" (song), a harmonica instrumental recorded by Little Walter Jacobs
 Juke joint, an informal establishment featuring blues music, dancing, and alcoholic drinks 
 Juke Kartel an Australian rock band
 Juke Magazine (1975–1992), an Australian national music industry newspaper
 Juke music (disambiguation), a term used to refer to ghetto house music and footwork/juke music
 Nissan Juke, a car
 Samsung Juke, a mobile phone created by Samsung

People
 Guy Juke (born 1951), a.k.a. De White, American graphic artist
 Juke Boy Bonner (1932–1978), the American  blues  singer, Weldon H. Philip Bonner
 Jukes family, a New York hill family studied in 19th and early 20th century euthenics research

See also
 Jukes
 Jukebox, a partially automated music-playing device that plays songs selected from self-contained media
 Juking, a sexualized form of dancing, associated with juke house